"The Heirs of the Dragon" is the series premiere of the HBO fantasy drama television series House of the Dragon, an adaptation of the second half of George R. R. Martin's book Fire & Blood. The first episode of the first season was written by series co-creator Ryan Condal and directed by co-showrunner and executive producer Miguel Sapochnik. In the United States, the episode aired on August 21, 2022, on HBO.

As the first episode of the series, it introduces the setting and the main characters of the show. The episode received highly positive critical reviews, with praise going towards Sapochnik's direction, the jousting scene, cast, and performances, particularly that of Matt Smith.

Plot
In 101 AC, King Jaehaerys I Targaryen, having outlived all his children, convened a Great Council to select a heir and avoid a potential war of succession. While Prince Viserys, Jaehaerys' oldest grandson, was chosen, several lords supported Princess Rhaenys, Jaehaerys' oldest living descendant.

Nine years into Viserys's reign, his wife, Queen Aemma Arryn, is again with child. After many failed pregnancies, Viserys is certain Aemma will bear a healthy son. A great tournament is organized to celebrate the impending birth. Ser Otto Hightower, the Hand of the King, insists that Prince Daemon, Viserys's brother and heir presumptive, is unfit to rule, citing his brutal methods as Commander of the City Watch, but Viserys ignores his advice.

At the tournament, Viserys's only living child, Princess Rhaenyra, and her companion, Lady Alicent Hightower, Ser Otto's daughter, are intrigued by Ser Criston Cole, a handsome, common-born knight who defeats the popular Daemon in both jousting and melee. Meanwhile, Aemma suffers a breech birth that drastically risks both her life and her baby's. Viserys allows Grand Maester Mellos to perform a cesarean section, hoping to save the child, though knowing the procedure will kill Aemma. The infant, named Baelon, dies hours after his mother. Rhaenyra's dragon Syrax cremates their remains during the funeral.

At Ser Otto's request, Alicent makes a condolence visit to Viserys. Ser Otto later informs the Small Council that, at a local brothel, Daemon mockingly referred to the deceased Baelon as "the heir for a day." When confronted, Daemon says Viserys never supported him and claims he is a weak king manipulated by others, particularly Ser Otto. Outraged, Viserys removes Daemon as his heir in favor of Rhaenyra and banishes Daemon from King's Landing. 

Viserys tells Rhaenyra a secret passed down through the generations: their ancestor Aegon the Conqueror dreamt of a threat from the North that Westeros can only defeat if a Targaryen sits on the Iron Throne. The lords of Westeros swear fealty to Rhaenyra as crown princess, while Daemon and his lover, Mysaria, depart atop his dragon, Caraxes.

Production

Writing and filming 
"The Heirs of the Dragon" was directed and written by showrunners and executive producers Miguel Sapochnik and Ryan Condal, respectively. It marks Sapochnik's return to the Game of Thrones franchise and his seventh directorial credit in the franchise. He previously directed the Game of Thrones episodes "The Gift", "Hardhome", "Battle of the Bastards", "The Winds of Winter", "The Long Night", and "The Bells".

Casting 
The series' starring cast members include Paddy Considine, Matt Smith, Emma D'Arcy, Rhys Ifans, Steve Toussaint, Eve Best, Fabien Frankel, Milly Alcock, Emily Carey, Sonoya Mizuno, and Graham McTavish. D'Arcy was credited for narrating the episode's opening scene, but they did not make an on-screen appearance. In late 2020, Considine's casting was announced on October 5, while Smith and D'Arcy were cast on December 11. In 2021, Ifans, Toussaint, Best, and Mizuno were announced to have joined the cast on February 11, followed by Frankel on April 15, and Alcock and Carey on July 6.

Reception

Ratings
"The Heirs of the Dragon" had 9.99 million viewers, which made it the biggest series premiere for HBO. The size of the audience caused HBO Max in the US and Crave in Canada to crash for some users. Downdetector reported 3700 instances of the application not responding. HBO said the viewership represented the largest single-day viewership for a series debut in HBO Max's history.

On August 26, it was mentioned by HBO that the viewership number has risen to 20 million across the United States. After one week of availability, the viewership rose to nearly 25 million in the U.S. across all platforms.

According to Nielsen, the episode had a viewership of 327 million minutes or an estimated 5.03 million viewers on HBO Max in the U.S. during its first day. It later estimated that the episode was watched by 10.6 million viewers on HBO Max in the first four days, with the number increasing to 14.5 million when including the viewership on the main HBO channel. Samba TV meanwhile stated that 4.8 million U.S. households streamed the episode in the first four days.

On HBO alone, an estimated 2.17 million viewers watched the premiere episode during its first broadcast. For the four broadcasts of the episode during premiere night, the viewership was 3.2 million. In the United Kingdom, the episode was watched by 1.39 million on Sky Atlantic and became the biggest drama launch ever on Sky.

Critical reception
The episode received highly positive critical reviews. On the review aggregator Rotten Tomatoes, it holds an approval rating of 85% based on 155 reviews, with an average rating of 7.6/10. The site's critical consensus said, "Bearing the weight of a hallowed TV lineage, 'The Heirs of the Dragon' won't fully fire viewers up for another Game of Thrones, but solidly sets the board with plenty of blood."

Writing for IGN, Helen O'Hara gave the premiere episode a rating of 8 out of 10 and said, "House of the Dragons premiere marks a strong, well-cast start to the Game of Thrones spin-off. This feels very close to its predecessor in tone and content, but immediately establishes a struggle for power around an amiable, weak-willed king, and vivid new characters to fight those battles." Alec Bojalad of Den of Geek gave it a four out of five stars and deemed it as "in many ways better [than 'Winter Is Coming'] as it's a far more focused experience," and further praised the acting (particularly Smith's) and the jousting scenes. Rebecca Nicholson of The Guardian, in her review for the first six episodes, called the first episode "spectacular" and that "it rattles through everything that made its predecessor, Game of Thrones, such a titan of the small screen." Grading the episode with a "B", Jenna Scherer of The A.V. Club described it as "If this first episode is anything to go on, House of the Dragon will be a more staid affair than Game of Thrones, for better or worse." However, she criticized the production design, particularly "the outfits, technology and jargon", for being "identical to the ones in Game of Thrones" despite taking place two centuries earlier.

Accolades

Notes

References

External links
 "The Heirs of the Dragon" at HBO
 
 

2022 American television episodes
House of the Dragon episodes
American television series premieres
Television episodes directed by Miguel Sapochnik